Hibbertia procumbens, commonly known as spreading guinea flower, is a species of flowering plant in the family Dilleniaceae and is endemic to south-eastern Australia. It is a prostrate, often mat-forming shrub with more or less glabrous stems, linear to narrow lance-shaped leaves with the narrower end towards the base, and yellow flowers with eighteen to twenty-five stamens arranged in groups around usually four glabrous carpels.

Description
The flowers are arranged on the ends of branches and are sessile, surrounded by a cluster of up to six leaves. There are eighteen to twenty-five stamens arranged in groups around usually four glabrous carpels. Flowering occurs from October to December.

Taxonomy
Spreading guinea flower was first formally described in 1806 by Jacques Labillardière who gave it the name Dillenia procumbens in Novae Hollandiae Plantarum Specimen. In 1817, Augustin Pyramus de Candolle changed the name to Hibbertia procumbens in Regni Vegetabilis Systema Naturale. The specific epithet (procumbens) means "low-lying".

Distribution and habitat
Spreading guinea flower occurs in New South Wales, Victoria and Tasmania, growing in sandy soil, usually in heath. It is widespread and common in Tasmania, found in near-coastal areas of southern Victoria, but rare in New South Wales where it only occurs on the Central Coast near Somersby, Kulnura and Mangrove Mountain.

Conservation status
Hibbertia procumbens is listed as "endangered" under the New South Wales Government Biodiversity Conservation Act 2016.

References

procumbens
Flora of New South Wales
Flora of Victoria (Australia)
Flora of Tasmania
Taxa named by Jacques Labillardière
Plants described in 1806